Dhanalakshmi, I Love You is a 2002 Indian Telugu-language comedy film directed by  Siva Nageswara Rao and starring Allari Naresh, Aditya Om, Naresh, and Ankitha. It is based on the Malayalam film Ramji Rao Speaking (1989).

Cast 
Allari Naresh as Raju
Aditya Om as Shyam
Naresh as Babu Rao
Ankitha as Dhana Lakshmi
 Sony Raj
 M. Balayya
Banerjee as Kabeera
Tanikella Bharani as Babu Nayak
Suman Setty
Dharmavarapu Subramanyam as the bank manager
Ahuti Prasad as Devi Prasad

Soundtrack 
The soundtrack was composed by Chakri.

Release and reception 
The film released on 18 October 2002. Gudipoodi Srihari of The Hindu opined that "Histrionically speaking, it is the senior Naresh who steals the limelight, with a peculiar make-up given to his role of Babu Rao". Jeevi of Idlebrain.com gave the film a rating of 2.75/5 and said that "The movie looks very artificial except a few scenes where the love of Naresh towards his mother is projected". A critic from Full Hyderabad said that "Dhanalaxmi... stands out more for what it transgresses rather than what it embraces".

References

External links 

Indian comedy films
Telugu remakes of Malayalam films
2000s Telugu-language films
Films scored by Chakri